Prudence Sebalo (born 16 April 1985), is a South African DJ and record producer prominently known under the alias of Miss Pru DJ (or simply Miss Pru). She gained recognition subsequent to the release of her single "Ameni" with guest appearances from Sjava, Emtee, Saudi, A-Reece, Fifi Cooper and B3nchmarQ.

She signed a recording deal with Ambitiouz Entertainment in 2015 and made her departure after 7 years in late 2022. In 2021 Miss Pru became the first female DJ to take home a SAMA award.

Awards and nominations

References

External links
 

Living people
1985 births
South African DJs
South African radio presenters
South African women radio presenters
South African record producers